The Bureau of Alcohol, Tobacco, Firearms and Explosives (ATF) operates a number of field divisions within the United States. The following list gives the locations of these offices. This article merely lists states and cities that have field divisions with links that go not to field divisions in states, but to general information on the states and cities. Some offices are located in a different city or town than the one in the office's name. This will be noted in the list.

List of field divisions 
 Alabama (4 offices)
 Birmingham
 Huntsville (located at Redstone Arsenal)
 Mobile
 Montgomery

 Alaska (1 office)
 Anchorage

 Arizona (4 offices)
 Flagstaff
 Phoenix
 Sierra Vista
 Tucson

 Arkansas (2 offices)
 Fort Smith
 Little Rock

 California (20 offices)
 Benicia
 Dublin (same location as the San Francisco field division)
 El Centro (located in Imperial)
 Fresno
 Glendale
 Long Beach
 Los Angeles (two offices; one in Glendale)
 Oakland
 Riverside
 Sacramento
 San Bernardino
 San Diego (two offices; one in Carlsbad)
 San Francisco (two offices; one in Dublin)
 San Jose
 Santa Ana
 Santa Maria
 Stockton

 Colorado (2 offices)
 Colorado Springs
 Denver

 Connecticut (2 offices)
 Hartford
 New Haven

 Delaware (1 office)
 Wilmington

 District of Columbia (1 office)
 Washington, D.C. (Ariel Rios Federal Building)

 Florida (14 offices)
 Fort Lauderdale
 Fort Myers
 Ft. Pierce (located in Port St. Lucie)
 Gainesville
 Jacksonville
 Miami
 Orlando (two offices)
 Panama City
 Pensacola
 Tallahassee
 Tampa (two offices)
 West Palm Beach

 Georgia (5 offices)
 Atlanta
 Augusta
 Columbus
 Macon
 Savannah

 Guam (1 office)
 Mong Mong

 Hawaii (2 offices)
 Hawaii County (located in Hilo)
 Honolulu

 Idaho (1 office)
 Boise

 Illinois (5 offices)
 Chicago
 Downers Grove
 Fairview Heights
 Rockford
 Springfield

 Indiana (4 offices)
 Evansville
 Fort Wayne
 Indianapolis
 Merrillville (located in Crown Point)

 Iowa (4 offices)
 Cedar Rapids
 Davenport
 Des Moines
 Sioux City

 Kansas (1 office)
 Wichita

 Kentucky (6 offices)
 Ashland
 Bowling Green
 Lexington
 London
 Louisville
 Paducah

 Louisiana (4 offices)
 Baton Rouge
 Lafayette
 New Orleans (located in Metairie)
 Shreveport

 Maine (2 offices)
 Bangor
 Portland

 Maryland (3 offices)
 Baltimore
 Hyattsville (two offices; one in Greenbelt, one in Lanham)

 Massachusetts (4 offices)
 Boston
 Bridgewater
 Springfield
 Worcester

 Michigan (6 offices)
 Ann Arbor
 Detroit
 Flint
 Grand Rapids
 Lansing
 Marquette

 Minnesota (2 offices)
 Duluth
 Saint Paul

 Mississippi (3 offices)
 Gulfport
 Jackson
 Oxford

 Missouri (6 offices)
 Cape Girardeau
 Jefferson City
 Kansas City (two offices)
 Springfield
 St. Louis

 Montana (3 offices)
 Billings
 Helena
 Missoula

 Nebraska (1 office)
 Omaha

 Nevada (2 offices)
 Las Vegas
 Reno

 New Hampshire (1 office)
 Manchester (located in Bedford)

 New Jersey (5 offices)
 Atlantic City (located in Egg Harbor Township)
 Camden (located in Cherry Hill)
 Newark (two offices; both in Woodland Park)
 Trenton

 New Mexico (3 offices)
 Albuquerque
 Las Cruces
 Roswell

 New York (8 offices)
 Albany
 Buffalo
 Hudson Valley (located in the Bronx)
 Long Island (located in Melville)
 New York City (two offices)
 Rochester
 Syracuse

 North Carolina (6 offices)
 Asheville
 Asheville
 Fayetteville
 Greensboro
 Raleigh
 Wilmington

 North Dakota (2 offices)
 Bismarck
 Fargo

 Ohio (6 offices)
 Cincinnati
 Cleveland (located in Independence)
 Columbus (two offices)
 Toledo
 Youngstown (located in Poland)

 Oklahoma (2 offices)
 Oklahoma City
 Tulsa

 Oregon (2 offices)
 Eugene
 Portland

 Pennsylvania (8 offices)
 Erie
 Harrisburg
 Lansdale
 Philadelphia (two offices)
 Pittsburgh
 Reading (located in Allentown)
 Wilkes-Barre

 Puerto Rico (2 offices)
 Mayagüez
 San Juan

 Rhode Island (1 office)
 Providence

 South Carolina (4 offices)
 Charleston
 Columbia
 Florence
 Greeneville

 South Dakota (2 offices)
 Rapid City
 Sioux Falls

 Tennessee (7 offices)
 Chattanooga
 Greeneville
 Jackson
 Knoxville
 Memphis
 Nashville (two offices; both in Franklin)

 Texas (17 offices)
 Amarillo
 Austin
 Beaumont
 Brownsville (located in Harlingen)
 Corpus Christi
 Dallas
 El Paso
 Fort Worth
 Houston
 Laredo
 Lubbock
 McAllen
 Plano
 San Antonio
 Sherman
 Tyler
 Waco

 U.S. Virgin Islands (2 offices)
 Saint Croix (located in Christiansted)
 Saint Thomas

 Utah (1 office)
 Salt Lake City

 Vermont (1 office)
 Burlington

 Virginia (8 offices)
 Bristol
 Falls Church
 Newport News (located in Hampton)
 Norfolk
 Richmond (two offices)
 Roanoke
 Winchester

 Washington (3 offices)
 Seattle
 Spokane
 Yakima (located in Union)

 West Virginia (4 offices)
 Charleston
 Clarksburg (located in Bridgeport)
 Martinsburg
 Wheeling

 Wisconsin (2 offices)
 Madison
 Milwaukee

 Wyoming (2 offices)
 Cheyenne
 Lander

See also 
 List of FBI field offices
 List of United States Secret Service field offices

References 

Buildings of the United States government
Bureau of Alcohol, Tobacco, Firearms and Explosives